The following list is composed of the species of conopid fly recorded in Britain.

Subfamily Conopinae

Tribe Conopini

 Genus Conops Linnaeus, 1758
 Subgenus Conops Linnaeus, 1758
 Conops ceriaeformis Meigen, 1824
 Conops flavipes Linnaeus, 1758
 Conops quadrifasciatus De Geer, 1776
 Conops strigatus Wiedemann in Meigen, 1824
 Conops vesicularis Linnaeus, 1761
 Genus Leopoldius Rondani, 1843
Leopoldius brevirostris (Germar, 1827)
Leopoldius signatus (Wiedemann in Meigen, 1824)

Tribe Physocephalini

 Genus Physocephala Schiner, 1861
Physocephala nigra (De Geer, 1776)
Physocephala rufipes (Fabricius, 1781)

Subfamily Myopinae

Tribe Myopini

 Genus Myopa Fabricius, 1775
 Myopa buccata (Linnaeus, 1758, 1758)
 Myopa extricata Collin, 1960
 Myopa fasciata Meigen, 1804
 Myopa occulta Wiedemann in Meigen, 1824
 Myopa polystigma Rondani, 1857
 Myopa strandi Duda, 1940
 Myopa tessellatipennis Motschulsky, 1859
 Myopa testacea (Linnaeus, 1758, 1767)
 Myopa vicaria Walker, 1849
 Genus Thecophora Rondani, 1845
 Thecophora atra (Fabricius, 1775)
 Thecophora fulvipes (Robineau-Desvoidy, 1830)

Tribe Sicini

 Genus Sicus Latreille, 1796
 Sicus abdominalis Kröber, 1915
 Sicus ferrugineus (Linnaeus, 1761)

Tribe Zodionini

 Genus Zodion Latreille, 1796
 Zodion cinereum (Fabricius, 1794)
 Zodion notatum (Meigen, 1804)

References
 Chandler, Peter (1998) "Handbooks for the Identification of British Insects Volume 12 – Checklists of the insects of the British Isles (New Series) Part 1: Diptera" pp. 119–120 Royal Entomological Society

Conopidae
Conopidae
Conopids
Diptera of Europe
 List